The Estheria Shales Formation is a geologic formation in Scotland. It preserves fossils dating back to the Jurassic period.

See also

 List of fossiliferous stratigraphic units in Scotland

References
 

Jurassic Scotland
Shale formations